Adam Eucharyst Adamczyk (born 1 October 1950) is a Polish judoka. He competed in the 1972 and 1976 Summer Olympics.

References

External links
 

1950 births
Living people
Judoka at the 1972 Summer Olympics
Judoka at the 1976 Summer Olympics
Polish male judoka
Olympic judoka of Poland
Sportspeople from Warsaw